Liotyphlops wilderi is a species of snake in the family Anomalepididae. The species is endemic to Brazil.

Etymology
The specific name, wilderi, is in honor of Burt Green Wilder, who was an American comparative anatomist and naturalist.

Geographic range
L. wilderi is found in southeastern Brazil, in the Brazilian states of Minas Gerais and Rio de Janeiro.

Habitat
The preferred natural habitats of L. wilderi are forest and savanna.

Reproduction
L. wilderi is oviparous.

References

Further reading
Dixon JR, Kofron CP (1983). "The Central and South American Anomalepid Snakes of the Genus Liotyphlops ". Amphibia-Reptilia 4 (2): 241–264.
Garman S (1883). "On certain Reptiles from Brazil and Florida". Science Observer, Boston 4 (5/6): 47–48. (Typhlops wilderi, new species, p. 48).
Hammar AG (1908). "Note on the Type Specimen of a Blind Snake Helminthophis wilderi (Garman), from Brazil". Annals and Magazine of Natural History, Eighth Series 1: 334–335. (Helminthophis wilderi, new combination, pp. 334–335, Figures a-c).
Vanzolini PE (1948). "Notas sóbre os ofídios e lagartos da cachoeira de ema, no município de Pirassununga, estado de São Paulo ". Revista Brasileira de Biologia, Rio de Janeiro 8: 377–400. (Liotyphlops wilderi, new combination, p. 380. (in Portuguese).

Anomalepididae
Endemic fauna of Brazil
Reptiles described in 1883